The Black Hole Initiative (BHI) is an interdisciplinary center at Harvard University that includes the fields of Astronomy, Physics and Philosophy, and is claimed to be the first center in the world to focus on the study of black holes. Principal participants include Sheperd S. Doeleman, Peter Galison, Avi Loeb, Andrew Strominger and Shing-Tung Yau. The BHI Inauguration was held on 18 April 2016 and was attended by Stephen Hawking; related workshop events were held on 19 April 2016. Robert Dijkgraaf created the mural for the BHI Inauguration.

The BHI is funded by the John Templeton Foundation and the Gordon and Betty Moore Foundation. Harvard University allocated office space for the BHI on the second floor of 20 Garden Street in Cambridge, Massachusetts. The BHI is an independent Center within the Faculty of Arts & Sciences at Harvard University.

See also

 Cosmology
 Galactic Center
 Galaxy
 General relativity
 List of black holes
 Outline of black holes
 Timeline of black hole physics

References

External links
 Official website
 Official Youtube Channel
 Inauguration workshop events (19 April 2017):
 
 
 
 

Astrophysics
Cosmological simulation
Physical cosmology